Greatest Hits is a compilation album by American country music artist Charley Pride. It was released in September 1981 via RCA Records. The album includes the single "Never Been So Loved (In All My Life)".

Track listing

Chart performance

References

1981 compilation albums
Charley Pride albums
Albums produced by Norro Wilson
RCA Records compilation albums